The London and North Western Railway (LNWR) "Precursor" Class was a type of 4-4-0 ("American") steam locomotive designed by the company's Chief Mechanical Engineer, George Whale. Introduced in 1904, it should not be confused with the LNWR 2-4-0 "Precursor" Class of 1874 designed by Francis Webb, the last example of which was scrapped in 1895. In 1906, a 4-4-2T ("Atlantic") tank variant of Webb's engine, the "Precursor Tank" Class, also entered service.

History

The Precursor Class was essentially a larger version of the LNWR "Improved Precedent" Class, being Whale's first attempt at producing a locomotive which would remove the requirement for express trains to be double headed (then standard practice on the LNWR). 130 examples of the class were constructed at Crewe Works between March 1904 and August 1907, their introduction allowing Whale to phase out the unreliable compound locomotives favoured by his predecessor, Francis Webb.  As built, they were saturated, although a small number were fitted with superheaters between February 1913 and September 1919.

Whilst the Precursors created issues for crews as some of the cab controls were difficult to operate or reach, they were generally successful in terms of operating performance. A consequence of this was the introduction of an extended version of the Precursors, the 4-6-0 "Experiment" Class, in 1905. Nevertheless, double heading was still necessary on many trains north of Preston due to accelerated schedules and increased loads.

In 1919, the Precursors were developed by Whale's successor, Charles Bowen-Cooke, into the  superheated "George the Fifth" Class. The main visual difference was that the Precursors had separate splashers over each of the driving wheels while the Georges had combined splashers that covered both pairs.

The LNWR reused numbers and names from withdrawn locomotives, with the result that the numbering system was completely haphazard.  Starting with the first of the class 513 "Precursor" in 1913, were given superheaters, the process continuing until just after grouping in 1923.  Most of the superheated engines were also converted from having slide valves to piston valves.

This resulted in two main subclasses; saturated locomotives with  cylinders, and superheated locomotives with  cylinders.  The LMS gave them the power classification 3P.  The saturated engines were given the LMS numbers in the 5187–5266 series, though not all survived long enough to receive them.  The superheated engines were given the LMS numbers 5270–5319 (5267–5269 were not used).

The LMS continued to superheat engines until 1926, these rebuilds retained their LMS number.  Also, three superheated engines became saturated via boiler swaps.

Withdrawals of the saturated engines started in 1927 and the last engine in as built condition was withdrawn in 1935.  The four superheated engines which retained slide valves were withdrawn from 1931 to 1936.  Withdrawals of the superheated engines with piston valves began in 1935.  Those not withdrawn had 20000 added to their numbers from 1934 to 1937 to make room for Black Fives.

By the outbreak of the Second World War in September 1939, only 11 Precursors were still in service. A single example, 25297 "Sirocco", was inherited by British Railways in 1948, but this was withdrawn in June 1949 before the number it had been allocated (58010) could be applied.

None were preserved.

Accidents

Great Bridgeford 

Of the 70 to 80 passengers on board the train, three were killed immediately and a fourth died in hospital the next day. Together with the driver and fireman, 9 passengers received injuries serious enough to require hospital care, whilst a further 18 were treated at the scene and able to continue their journeys.

Fleet list

See also
 Locomotives of the London and North Western Railway

Notes

References

Sources

Precursor (Whale)
4-4-0 locomotives
Railway locomotives introduced in 1904
Standard gauge steam locomotives of Great Britain
Scrapped locomotives